The Harare Sports Club is a cricket ground in Harare, Zimbabwe. There have been 51 Test centuries scored at the ground and 74 in One Day Internationals (ODIs).

Key
 * denotes that the batsman was not out.
 Inns. denotes the number of the innings in the match.
 Balls denotes the number of balls faced in an innings.
 NR denotes that the number of balls was not recorded.
 Parentheses next to the player's score denotes his century number at the Harare Sports Club.
 The column title Date refers to the date the match started.
 The column title Result refers to whether the player's team won, lost or if the match was drawn or a tie.

Test centuries

The following table summarises the Test centuries scored at the Harare Sports Club.

One Day International centuries

The following table summarises the One Day International centuries scored at the Harare Sports Club.

Twenty20 International centuries

The following table summarises the Twenty20 Internationals centuries scored at the Harare Sports Club.

References 

Harare
Cricket grounds in Zimbabwe
Zimbabwean cricket lists